Izki Air Base  is an airport serving the town of Izki in Oman.

See also
Transport in Oman

References

 OurAirports - Oman
  Great Circle Mapper - Izki
 Izki
 Google Earth

Airports in Oman